Pfreimd (in its upper course: Katharinabach) is a river of Plzeň Region, Czech Republic and Bavaria, Germany. It flows into the Naab in the town Pfreimd.

See also
List of rivers of Bavaria

References

Rivers of Bavaria
Rivers of the Plzeň Region
Rivers of the Upper Palatine Forest
Rivers of Germany
International rivers of Europe